This article is about the particular significance of the decade 1770 - 1779 to Wales and its people.

Incumbents
Prince of Wales - George (later George IV)
Princess of Wales - vacant

Events
1770 in Wales
1771 in Wales
1772 in Wales
1773 in Wales
1774 in Wales
1775 in Wales
1776 in Wales
1777 in Wales
1778 in Wales
1779 in Wales

Arts and literature

New books
Thomas Churchyard - The Worthines of Wales, a Poem (1776)
Evan Evans (Ieuan Fardd) - Casgliad o Bregethau (1776)
Williams Evans - A New English-Welsh dictionary: Containing All Words Necessary for Reading an English Author (1771)
Elizabeth Griffith - The Morality of Shakespeare's Drama Illustrated (1775)
Evan Hughes (Hughes Fawr) - Duwdod Crist (1777)
Jinny Jenks - Tour through Wales (1772)
Dafydd Jones - Marwnad Enoch Ffransis (1774)
Hugh Jones (Maesglasau) 
Cydymaith yr Hwsmon (1774)
Gardd y Caniadau (1776)
Robert Jones 
Lleferydd yr Asyn (1770)
Drych i'r Anllythrennog (1778)
Iolo Morganwg - Dagrau yr Awen (1772)
Nicholas Owen - British Remains (1777)
Thomas Pennant - British Zoology, vol. 4 (1777)
David Powell (Dewi Nantbrân) -  (1776)
Daniel Rowland - Pum Pregeth ac Amryw o Hymnau (1772)
Nathaniel Williams - Dialogus (1778)
William Williams Pantycelyn - Ductor Naptiarum: Neu Gyfarwyddwr Priodas (1777)
Sir John Wynn - History of the Gwydir Family (posthumously published in 1770)

Music
Dafydd Jones - Difyrrwch i'r Pererinion, vol. 3

Births
1770
15 January - Sir John Edwards, Baronet, politician (died 1850)
14 April - John Evans, explorer (died 1799)
30 April - David Thompson, explorer (died 1857)
1772
10 January - William Jenkins Rees, antiquary (died 1855)
July - Edward Hughes (Y Dryw), bard (died 1850)
25 October - Sir Watkin Williams-Wynn, 5th Baronet (died 1840)
1773
14 November - Stapleton Cotton, 1st Viscount Combermere, military leader (died 1865)
1774
May - John Elias, preacher (died 1841)
24 June - Azariah Shadrach, writer (died 1844)
1775
25 November - Charles Kemble, actor (died 1854)
1776
April - Ann Griffiths, hymn-writer (died 1805)
2 August - Thomas Assheton Smith I, industrialist and politician (died 1858)
1777
15 June - David Daniel Davis, royal obstetrician (died 1841)
29 August - John James, hymn-writer (died 1848)
15 September - John Jones of Ystrad, MP (died 1842)
1778
29 September - Benjamin Hall, industrialist and politician (died 1817)
1779
24 August - Charles Norris, artist (died 1858)

Deaths
1771
15 May - Thomas Morgan (of Rhiwpera), politician, 43
date unknown 
Lewis Hopkin, poet
Alban Thomas, doctor, librarian and antiquarian
Richard Trevor, former bishop of St David's
1772
16 October - Richard Farrington, antiquary, 71
1773
21 July - Howell Harris, Methodist leader, 59
1774
date unknown - Dafydd Nicolas, poet
1775
14 August - Sir Lynch Cotton, 4th Baronet
1776
1 November - Miles Harry, Baptist minister, 76
date unknown - Sir John Powell Pryce, 6th Baronet (in debtors' prison)
1777
4 March - Edward Richard, teacher and poet, 62
April - John Hodges, Methodist, 77
1 July - Sir John Glynne, 6th Baronet, 64
30 August - Dafydd Jones, hymn-writer, 66
18 December - William Lloyd, translator, 60
1778
6 October - William Worthington, priest and author, 74
1779
11 December - "Madam" Bridget Bevan, philanthropist, 81

 
18th century in Wales
Wales
Wales
Decades in Wales